Tașlîc (Romanian;) is a commune and village in Transnistria, Moldova, the second largest commune in the Grigoriopol sub-district. Its name is derived from the Turkic word taşlık, meaning "stony place". The majority of the population of the town is Moldovan, while an important part of the population is of Russian descent.

External links 
 Map

Communes of Transnistria
Tiraspolsky Uyezd